

The three types of intercity roads in Turkey

• Motorways are controlled-access highways that are officially named Otoyol. But it isn't uncommon that people in Turkey call them Otoban (referring to Autobahn) as this types of roads entered popular culture by the means of Turks in Germany. They also depend on the General Directorate of Highways except those that are financed with a BOT model.

• State roads (Devlet Yolları) are historical and free road network called State roads that are completely under the responsibility of the General Directorate of Highways except for urban sections (like the sections falling within the inner part of ring roads of Ankara, Istanbul or İzmir). Even if they mostly possess dual carriageways and interchanges, they also have some traffic lights and intersections.

• Provincial roads (Il Yolları) are highways of secondary importance
linking districts within a province to each other, the
provincial center, the districts in the neighboring provinces,
the state roads, railway stations, seaports, and airports.

Motorways: Motorway  3.633 km (January 2023)
Dual carriageways: 28.986 km (January 2023)
State Highways 30.954 km (January 2023)
Provincial Roads 34.113 km  (January 2023)
Motorway Projects‐Vision 8.325 km (in 2053)

As of 2023, there are 471 tunnels (total length 665 km) and 9.660 bridges (total length 739 km) on the network.

Motorways

State roads

The numbering of state roads is as indicated below:
 D0XX, D1XX, D2XX, D3XX, D4XX: West–east roads (numbered west to east )
 D5XX, D6XX, D7XX, D8XX, D9XX: North–south roads (numbered north to south)

West – east reference main

  Karasu – Akçakoca – Karadeniz Ereğli-Zonguldak – Çaycuma – Bartın – Cide – İnebolu – Ayancık – Sinop – Gerze-Bafra-Samsun – Çarşamba – Ünye – Fatsa – Ordu – Bulancak – Giresun – Tirebolu – Trabzon – Sürmene – Rize – Ardeşen – Hopa – Borçka – Şavşat – Ardahan-Çıldır – Arpaçay – Akçakale village of Susuz
  Edirne – Lüleburgaz – İstanbul – Gebze – İzmit – Adapazarı – Düzce – Bolu – Gerede – Ilgaz – Merzifon – Amasya – Niksar – Erzincan – Erzurum – Ağrı – Doğubeyazıt – Gürbulak (Iran border)
  Çanakkale – Bandırma – Bursa – Eskişehir – Sivrihisar – Ankara – Kırıkkale – Yozgat -Sivas – Erzincan
  Çeşme -İzmir – Salihli – Uşak – Afyon – Akşehir – Konya – Aksaray – Nevşehir – Kayseri – Pınarbaşı – Gürün – Malatya – Elazığ – Bingöl – Muş – Bitlis – Van
  Datça – Fethiye – Antalya – Alanya – Anamur – Mersin – Adana – Gaziantep – Şanlıurfa – Şırnak – Hakkâri-Yüksekova-Esendere (Iran border)

West – east intermediate

  Kaynarca-Karasu
  Edirne- Kırklareli-Pınarhisar-Vize-Saray-İstanbul-Şile-Kandıra-Kaynarca-Adapazarı
  Devrek-Yenice-Karabük-Araç-Kastamonu-Taşköprü-Boyabat-Durağan-Vezirköprü-Havza-Ladik-Near Taşova
  Şebinkarahisar-Alucra-Şiran-Kelkit
  Intersection of D885 (E97) and D883-Bayburt-Değimencik village (It also part of D915)-İspir-Yusufeli-Intersection of D950
  Köse-Bayburt (From Bayburt it merges with D915)-Aşkale (From Bayburt it merges with D-100)-Nenehatun village of Dadaşköy
  Intersection of D950-Intersection of Olur-Intersection of D955-Göle-Intersection of Susuz-Intersection of European route 691 (D965)-Yolboyu village of Susuz (D010)-Şahnalar village-Akyaka intersection-Doğukapı border gate (Armenia border)
  Kars-Digor-Intersection of D080
  Horasan-Karakurt village of Sarıkamış (Intersection of D957)-Kağızman-Tuzluca-Iğdır -Aralık-Dilucu border gate (Nakhcivan republic of Azerbaijan border) (Between Iğdır to Nakhcivan border is part of E99)
  İpsala border gate (Greece border)-Keşan-Tekirdağ-Marmaraereğlisi-Silivri
  Intersection of D550-Kavakköy (Gelibolu)-Yeniköy (Şarköy)-Şarköy
  Yalova-Karamürsel-İzmit-Kandıra
  Bediltahirbey village of Akyazı-Akyazı-Çavuşdere village of Mudurnu-Nallıhan-Beypazarı-Ayaş- Sincan-Akyurt-Kalecik
  Orhangazi-İznik-Mekece village of Pamukova (It merges with D-650)-Pamukova-Geyve-Taraklı
  Kestel-Turanköy (It shares same way with D200)-Yenişehir-Bilecik-Vezirhan-Gölpazarı- Taraklı (From Taraklı to Göynük it shares same way with D170)-Göynük-Mudurnu intersection-Bolu
  Taraklı-Göynük-Nallıhan
  Intersection of D765-Intersection of Kızılırmak-Intersection of Bayat-İntersection of İskilip-Çorum-Intersection of D795-Mecitözü-Intersection of D100-Intersection of D190 (Near Turhal)-Intersection of Pazar-Tokat
  Intersection of D200-Delice-Sungurlu-Intersection of D785-Alaca-Zile-Turhal
  Çanakkale-Çan
  Edremit-Havran-Balıkesir (Intersection of D573)-Kepsut-Dursunbey-Harmancık- Tavşanlı (Intersection of D595)-Kümbet village of İnönü (From Kütahya to Kümbet, it shares same way with D650)- Eskişehir
  Intersection of 550-Bergama-Kınık intersection-Soma-Kırkağaç intersection-Akhisar(From Akhisar to Sındırgı, it shares same way with D555)-Sındırgı-Simav-Intersection of D595-Gediz-Çavdarhisar- Kütahya
  Manisa-Turgutlu
  Afyonkarahisar-Bayat-Sivrihisar (From Sivrihisar to Polatlı, it shares same way with D200)-Polatlı-Haymana-Gölbaşı-Oğulbey village of Gölbaşı (It shares with D750)-Bala-Karakeçili -Kaman-Kırşehir-Mucur-Kayseri-Gemerek-Şarkışla-Kovalı village of Ulaş (From Kovalı, it shares with D850 to Kangal) -Ulaş-Kangal-Divriği-Arapgir-Keban-Elazığ
  Kırgındere village of Karayazı-Karayazı-Tutak
  D959 intersection-Bulanık-Malazgirt-Patnos-Erciş-Karahan village of Erciş (Intersection of D975)
  Erciş-Van/Bitlis province border
  Nevşehir-Ürgüp-Intersection of D300
  Pamukyazı village of Torbalı (Intersection with D550)-Tire-Ödemiş-Kiraz-Hacıaliler village of Alaşehir (Intersection with D585)
  Aydın-Sultanhisar-Nazilli-Kuyucak-Sarayköy-Denizli-Bozkurt-Çardak-Dazkırı- Dinar-Çobansaray village of Dinar (Intersection with D650)
  Turgutreis of Bodrum-Bodrum-Milas-Yatağan (From Yatağan to Muğla, it shares with D550)-Muğla-Kale-Tavas-Sarıabat village of Tavas (From Sarıabat to Yassıhöyük village of Acıpayam, it shares with D585) -Serinhisar-Yeşilova-Burdur (D650)-Isparta (D685)-Eğirdir-Gelendost-Çetince village of Yalvaç-Şarkikaraağaç (D695)-Beyşehir-Konya-Karapınar-Ereğli-Intersection of Bor (D750)-Bor-Niğde (D805)-Yeşilhisar-İncesu-Intersection with D300-Kayseri-Pınarbaşı (Intersection with D815)-Intersection with D815 (Yeşilkent village of Sarız)-Göksun (D825)-Elbistan-Darıca village of Akçadağ (Intersection with D300)
  Seydişehir (D695) – Yalıhüyük – Bozkır – Hadim – Sarıveliler – Ermenek – Mut(D715)
  Uğurlu village of Fethiye – Korkuteli – Döşemealtı (Intersection with D650) – Antalya (D650)

North – south reference main
  Edirne – Çanakkale – Edremit – İzmir – Aydın – Muğla
  Karasu – Sakarya – Bilecik – Kütahya – Afyon – Sandıklı – Burdur – Antalya
  Zonguldak – Gerede – Ankara – Aksaray – Pozantı – Tarsus
  Ünye – Tokat – Sivas – Malatya – Gaziantep – Kilis (Syria border)
  Hopa – Artvin – Erzurum – Bingöl – Diyarbakır – Mardin

North – south intermediate

  Çatalca (D020) – Büyükçekmece (D100)
  Of, Trabzon (D010) – Dernekpazarı – Çaykara – Intersection with D050 – Bayburt-Maden, Bayburt – Aşkale (D100)

Provincial roads
Provincial roads (İl yolu) in Turkey are maintained by the KGM. These roads serve as secondary roads to the State Roads (D.XXX) and mainly connect small towns (every disctrict's capital town is accessible either by a state or a provincial road) or acting as alternate routes to the trunk roads.

A provincial road is governed under the responsibility of the respective Turkish provincial government, and bears the license plate number of that province in the road identification number's first half. (Example 35-04 List of provincial roads in Izmir Province)

See also
 International E-road network
 Asian Highway Network
List of otoyol routes in Turkey
 General Directorate of Highways (Turkey)
 List of motorway tunnels in Turkey
Transport in Turkey
Otoyol

References

Turkey
Lists of buildings and structures in Turkey
Turkey transport-related lists